The 1998 Arkansas Razorbacks football team represented the University of Arkansas during the 1998 NCAA Division I-A football season.

Houston Nutt became the first Arkansas head coach to win his first eight games, and the Razorbacks won a share of the 1998 SEC Western Division championship.

Schedule

Roster

Michael Snowden

Rankings

References

Arkansas
Arkansas Razorbacks football seasons
Arkansas Razorbacks football